Valen is an arm of the Kjelda fjord in Bindal municipality in Nordland in Norway. It gets its name from a hamlet of the same name which lies at its south-eastern end.

The mouth of the fjord arm stretches between, on the west, Skjevelneset on  Austra and, on the east, Hålopneset on the mainland. The bay runs 4 km southwestwards, ending at the Valastraumen, a narrow channel which links this fjord arm with that of Årsetfjorden in Nærøy municipality in Nord-Trøndelag.

The Valastraumen channel separates the hamlet of Bogen on Austra from the hamlet of Valen on the mainland. Although Valen fjord arm lies mostly in Nordland, the hamlet of Valen is in Nord-Trondelag.

Highway 771 runs along the north side of Valen fjord arm.

References

Bindal